Şemdinli District is a district in the Hakkâri Province of Turkey. The district had a population of 42,471 in 2022 with the town of Şemdinli as its seat. Parts of the district was separated to form Derecik District in 2018.

The district was established in 1936.

Settlements

Villages 
The district has twenty-two villages of which three are unpopulated:

 Alan
 Altınsu
 Ayranlı
 Bağlar
 Beyyurdu
 Boğazköy
 Bozyamaç
 Çalışkanlar
 Çatalca
 Çevre
 Çubuklu
 Günyazı
 Kayalar
 Konur
 Korgan
 Meşelik
 Öveç
 Tekeli
 Tütünlü
 Uğuraçan
 Yaylapınar
 Yufkalı

Hamlets 
The district has forty-two hamlets:

 Aktütün
 Aşağıkayalar
 Aşağıtuğlu
 Balıklı
 Binahare
 Çamlıca
 Çiçekli
 Deravi
 Dereyanı
 Elmalı
 Erik
 Güleç
 Güzekaya
 Güzelkonak
 Harbanlı
 İncesu
 Karakuş
 Kayacık (of Beyyurdu)
 Kayacık (of Boğazköy)
 Kepenek
 Koçbaşı
 Mağaraönü
 Meşeli
 Oğlaklı
 Olgunlar
 Öncü
 Rüzgarlı
 Samanlı
 Sarıca
 Seçkin
 Tanyolu
 Tuğlu
 Üçgöze
 Üstünağaç
 Üzümkıran (of Ayranlı)
 Üzümkıran (of Meşelik)
 Veliköy
 Yaman
 Yeniceli
 Yeşilbayır
 Yeşilköy
 Zorgeçit

Governance 
The current mayor is Tahir Sakli from the Justice and Development Party (AKP) and the current district governor (kaymakam) is Yakup Güven.

Population 
Population history from 2007 to 2022:

References 

Populated places in Hakkâri Province
Districts of Hakkâri Province
States and territories established in 1936